Wycliffe (and other similar spellings) may refer to:

People
John Wycliffe (and other spellings) (c.1320s – 1384), English theologian and Bible translator
 Wycliffe (name), includes a list of other people with the name

Places
 Wycliffe, County Durham, a village (historically in Yorkshire)
 Wycliffe, Modesto, California, a neighborhood of Modesto

Schools and colleges
 Wycliffe College, Gloucestershire, an English independent school
 Wycliffe College, Toronto, a Canadian graduate theological school
 Wycliffe Christian School, an Australian independent school in New South Wales
 Wycliffe Hall, Oxford, an English theological college of the University of Oxford

Arts and entertainment
 Wycliffe (TV series), a British television detective series
 Charles Wycliffe, a fictional detective created by W. J. Burley, on whose books the television series is based

Other uses
 Wycliffe Global Alliance, an alliance of Bible translating organisations
 Wycliffe Bible Translators (UK & Ireland)
 Wycliffe USA
 Wycliffe's Bible, a group of Bible translations into Middle English under John Wycliffe
 John Wickliffe (ship), 1841

See also
 Wickliffe (disambiguation)
 Wiglaf
 John Wycliffe: The Morning Star, a 1984 film
 Wyclef Jean, a Haitian rapper, musician and actor

pt:Wycliffe